Washington State Prison is located in Davisboro in Washington County, Georgia.  It is a facility for a maximum of 1548 adult male inmates at minimum and medium security. It is a part of the Georgia Department of Corrections.

The Washington State Prison is not to be confused with the Washington State Penitentiary, located in Walla Walla in the state of Washington.

References 

Prisons in Georgia (U.S. state)
Buildings and structures in Washington County, Georgia
1991 establishments in Georgia (U.S. state)